Mitsumata Dam is an earthfill dam located in Yamagata Prefecture in Japan. The dam is used for irrigation. The catchment area of the dam is 5.5 km2. The dam impounds about   ha of land when full and can store 142 thousand cubic meters of water. The construction of the dam was started on 1968 and completed in 1977.

References

Dams in Yamagata Prefecture
1977 establishments in Japan